Count Miksa Hadik de Futak (1868–1921) was a Hungarian diplomat, who served as Austro-Hungarian Ambassador to Mexico from 1909 to 1911 and to Sweden from 1912 to 1918, until end of the First World War.

Family
His parents were Count Béla Hadik de Futak, a Rear Admiral and Privy Councillor, and Countess Ilona Barkóczy de Szala, only daughter and heir of Count János Barkóczy. His brothers were Endre, Speaker of the House of Magnates; János, Minister of Food, Prime Minister of Hungary for a short time in 1918; Sándor, a Member of Parliament and Béla, who served as Lord Lieutenant (Count; comes) of Zemplén County.

External links
 William D. Godsey, Aristocratic Redoubt: The Austro-Hungarian Foreign Office on the Eve of the First World War, West Lafayette, Purdue University Press, 1999.
 Jahrbuch des k.u.k. Auswärtigen Dienstes, 22 vols., Vienna, K.K. Hof- und Staatsdruckerei, 1897–1918.
 Erwin Matsch, Geschichte des Auswärtigen Dienstes von Österreich-Ungarn 1720-1920, Vienna, Böhlau, 1980.

1868 births
1921 deaths
Hungarian politicians
Hungarian nobility
Hungarian diplomats
Miksa
Hungarian expatriates in Mexico
Hungarian expatriates in Sweden
Ambassadors of Austria-Hungary to Sweden
Ambassadors of Austria-Hungary to Mexico